Heatley is a suburb in the City of Townsville, Queensland, Australia.

Geography 
The land use is predominantly residential.

History
Heatley is situated in the traditional Wulgurukaba Aboriginal country. The origin of the suburb name is from W.J. Heatley, the former Mayor of Townsville from 1927 to 1933.

Heatley State High School opened on 30 January 1968. On 16 December 1999 it renamed Heatley Secondary College.

Heatley State School opened on 25 January 1971.

Townsville-Thuringowa Centre for Continuing Secondary Education opened on 29 January 1990 as an adult campus of Heatley Secondary College.

Education 
Heatley State School is a government primary (Early Childhood-6) school for boys and girls at 410 Fulham Road. In 2018, the school had an enrolment of 536 students with 51 teachers (45 full-time equivalent) and 34 non-teaching staff (21 full-time equivalent). It includes a special education program.

Heatley Secondary College is a government secondary (7-12) school for boys and girls on the corner of Hanlon Street and Fulham Road. In 2018, the school had an enrolment of 768 students with 66 teachers (64 full-time equivalent) and 41 non-teaching staff (32 full-time equivalent). It includes a special education program. It includes the Townsville-Thuringowa Centre for Continuing Secondary Education is a secondary (7-12) Centre for Continuing Secondary Education for adult students.

Amenities 
The Anglican Church of the Ascension is at 6 Mill Drive.

Heatley Park is a park in Fulham Road. It includes the Heatley Park Community Centre, the Long Tan Memorial Pool, the Western Suburbs Tennis Club and children's play equipment.

References 

Suburbs of Townsville